The Vietnamese National Football First League (V.League 2) is the second highest league in Vietnamese football after the V.League 1 with 14 teams competing in it.

Previous winners

Viettel F.C. sold their V. League slot to Thanh Hóa, to allow them to stay in the V. League after being relegated the previous season. Thanh Hóa therefore withdrew from the First Division, enforcing the league to have 13 entrants this campaign

See also
Football in Vietnam

References

External links
Vietnam Football Federation

Second level Vietnamese football league seasons
2
Viet
Viet